Dr. George W. Watt (January 8, 1911 – March 29, 1980) was an American chemist who participated in the Manhattan Project.

Life 
Watt was born in Bellaire, Ohio on January 8, 1911. He received his degrees at Ohio State University: BA (1931), MS (1933), and PhD (1935).
Watt joined the faculty of University of Texas, Austin in 1937, advanced through academic ranks, and served as a professor from 1947 until 1978, when he was given emeritus status.
During the years of 1943-45, he was on leave from the university as he worked on the Manhattan Project, as both a group leader and associate section chief on the Plutonium Project.

References 

1911 births
1980 deaths
20th-century American chemists
Ohio State University alumni